Ormoy-la-Rivière is a commune in the Essonne department in Île-de-France in northern France.

Inhabitants of Ormoy-la-Rivière are known as Ormoisiens.

Geography
The village lies on the right bank of the Juine, which flows northward through the commune.

See also
Communes of the Essonne department

References

External links

Mayors of Essonne Association 

Communes of Essonne